This is a list of the largest local police departments in the United States as defined by the Bureau of Justice Statistics, by numbers of full-time sworn personnel.

References

Law enforcement in the United States
Law enforcement agencies of the United States
Lists of law enforcement agencies